The Hyannis Sound is a professional a cappella singing group, composed of 10 young men from around the United States who convene each summer on Cape Cod, Massachusetts in the greater New England area.

Every summer, members of the Hyannis Sound live in a house together on Cape Cod, and perform at various venues across the Cape. The group performs at various self-produced weekly shows, parties, restaurants, backyard gatherings, cobblestone streets, and stadiums. Hyannis Sound's repertoire changes each summer, but always consists of a variety of popular songs derived from many eras and genres. Over the past 28 years, Hyannis Sound has received critical acclaim from the Recorded A Cappella Review Board, been awarded by the Contemporary A Cappella Society numerous times, and established themselves as a staple of Cape Cod's music and social community.

In 2020 during the global COVID-19 pandemic, Hyannis Sound went viral on the popular video-sharing app TikTok and quickly became one of the most followed vocal groups on the app. They have since partnered with brands like Nerds and were featured in Glamour magazine's You Sang My Song series featuring Alicia Keys after their cover of "Fallin'" achieved over 12 million views on TikTok.

History

Hyannis Sound was founded in 1994 by Townsend Belisle.  Encouraged by the success of the Vineyard Sound, which he founded and produced, Townsend decided to put together a similar group on Cape Cod.  The group rented a house in Hyannis to live together.  Starting small, the group made a name for itself by singing wherever they could.  After years of performances, the group began to establish itself as a notable entertainment group on the Cape.

Since its inception, the group has enjoyed more and more public notice, and now holds four weekly concerts within an area extending from Falmouth to Chatham.  The group is also established as a non-profit corporation in the Commonwealth of Massachusetts.

In 2020, the global COVID-19 pandemic threatened the continuity of the group. As a vocal performance group, it seemed almost impossible that the group could reprise the structure of their past summers. However, the nine members of Hyannis Sound 2020 managed to successfully travel to Cape Cod, quarantine together in their home and launch a virtual concert series. Throughout the summer, their following rose exponentially, becoming one of the most followed a cappella groups, achieving almost 700,000 followers across Facebook, Instagram, and TikTok.

Recordings

To date, the Sound has recorded fifteen albums.  Their first, Live, All-Natural A Cappella was a recording of their final 1994 concert.  This was followed by Talk About It in 1996, On the Beach in 1999, 110 in 2001, Aged Ten Years and Cape Standard Time in 2003, Route 6 in 2005, Shirt, Tie, Khaki in 2007, On the Clock in 2009, High Tide in 2011, Over the Bridge in 2013, H2O in 2015, and Boys of Summer in 2017. Always / Sometimes (2019) caps off the collection, containing songs performed by the group in the summers of 2017 and 2018.  In 2003, the group also began a practice of releasing an annual Bootleg, a live CD every year (recorded mid-summer from one show and released at their final show of the summer).

Hyannis Sound has performed the National Anthem at Fenway Park as well as various Cape Cod League games, and have been featured in publications including The Boston Globe, Glamour, Cape Cod Magazine, Cape Cod Times, and Martha Stewart Weddings.

On August 1, 2020, in the wake of the COVID-19 pandemic, political strife, and rising racial tensions across the U.S, Hyannis Sound released a recording and video of "O-o-h Child" by the Five Stairsteps featuring over 60 alumni, including members from the group's founding iteration.

Auditions

Every year the lineup of ten guys turns over members.  The group hosts auditions in Boston every spring and new members are chosen from an international pool of over 100 auditions. The weekend-long audition process judges auditions on both their personality/character and musicality/performance. Most candidates have had experience with one of thousands of college or university a cappella groups throughout the country.  These new members are put through a rigorous orientation of long rehearsals and welcome by alumni before embarking on their summer performance schedule.

Members

Notes

References

External links

A cappella musical groups
Barnstable, Massachusetts